Bernartice is a market town in Písek District in the South Bohemian Region of the Czech Republic. It has about 1,300 inhabitants.

Administrative parts
Villages of Bilinka, Bojenice, Dvůr Leveč, Jestřebice, Kolišov, Ráb, Rakov, Srlín, Svatkovice and Zběšice are administrative parts of Bernartice.

Geography
It lies in the Tábor Uplands. There are several ponds in the municipal territory.

History
The first written mention of Bernartice is from 1251.

During World War II Bernartice was threatened by the arrival of the Nazis which would have given the village a similar fate as the nearby village Lidice, which was burned down. With the help of locals, 23 people were killed and five were sent to concentration camps.

Sights
The landmark of Bernartice is the Church of Saint Martin. The originally Gothic church from the late 14th century was baroque rebuilt in the 16th century.

Gallery

References

External links

Populated places in Písek District
Market towns in the Czech Republic